Huang Xiaoxiang (born June 1956) is a former Chinese politician who spent his career in Sichuan and Beijing. As of July 2015, he has been removed from his posts, as the party's internal disciplinary body investigated Huang for corruption. Previously he served as deputy secretary general of the Chinese People's Political Consultative Conference and vice-president of the All-China Federation of Industry and Commerce.

Huang was a member of the 10th and 11th National People's Congress and the 12th national committee of Chinese People's Political Consultative Conference. Chinese media reported that he had close relations with Zhou Yongkang, who was a member of the 17th Politburo Standing Committee (PSC), China's highest decision-making body, and the Secretary of the Central Political and Legal Affairs Commission (Zhengfawei) between 2007 and 2012.

Biography
Huang was born in Dazu District of Chongqing, in June 1956. During the Cultural Revolution, he worked as a sent-down youth in Xichang County, Sichuan. In October 1978, he was accepted to Sichuan University, where he majored in economics. Then he studied and later taught at Southwestern University of Finance and Economics. From February 1986 to December 1988 he was a doctoral candidate at the Graduate School of Chinese Academy of Social Sciences.

Huang began his political career in August 1974, and joined the Communist Party of China in November 1984.

Beginning in December 1988, he served in several posts in the Chinese State Council, including deputy director, director, and investigator.

In March 1994 he became the chief economic manager of China Huatong Group Products, a state-owned enterprise. Nine months later, he was promoted to the vice president position.

In August 1995, he was appointed the deputy secretary general of Sichuan, he remained in that position until February 1999, when he was transferred to Neijiang and appointed the Communist Party Secretary.

He was promoted to become the vice-governor of Sichuan in January 2002, and served until February 2012.

In March 2013, he was appointed vice-president of the All-China Federation of Industry and Commerce and deputy secretary general of the Chinese People's Political Consultative Conference.

On 17 July 2015, he was removed from his posts on the Thirty-second session of the 12th National Committee of the CPPCC National Committee.

References 

1956 births
Living people
People's Republic of China politicians from Chongqing
Southwestern University of Finance and Economics alumni
Political office-holders in Beijing
Sichuan University alumni